Traves is a comune (municipality) in the Metropolitan City of Turin in the Italian region Piedmont, located about 30 km northwest of Turin.

Traves borders the following municipalities: Mezzenile, Pessinetto, Viù, and Germagnano.

The commune is less ancient than others in the valley and the parish church was built only in the seventeenth century.

The main activity of the village has been, for a long time, the exploitation of copper and nickel mines and its inhabitants were specialized in the production of nails.

Today the economy is based on tourism and on the work of commuters who reach the municipalities of the plain. In the village there is an "Ecomuseo dei Chiodaioli" (an ancient foundry) 

Curious and very popular are the typical festivals that punctuate the program of summer events animated by the associations of the country. Among these, the two patronal festivals of Santa Blandina (June 2) and San Pietro in Vincoli (in the first weekend of August), and some festivities dedicated to the ancient and fascinating chapels located in the various hamlets of the country and to the numerous voluntary associations.

References

External links
 www.traves.info/

Cities and towns in Piedmont